Marco Túlio Oliveira Lemos (born 13 March 1998), commonly known as Marco Túlio, is a Brazilian footballer who currently plays as a midfielder for Central Coast Mariners.

Club career
In the summer of 2018, Marco Túlio signed a five-year contract with Sporting CP until 2023.

International career
Marco Túlio represented Brazil at the 2015 South American Under-17 Football Championship.

Career statistics

Club

Notes

Honours
CSA
Campeonato Alagoano: 2021

References

External links

1998 births
Living people
Brazilian footballers
Brazilian expatriate footballers
Brazil youth international footballers
Association football midfielders
Clube Atlético Mineiro players
Sporting CP footballers
K.S.V. Roeselare players
Centro Sportivo Alagoano players
Central Coast Mariners FC players
Challenger Pro League players
Brazilian expatriate sportspeople in Portugal
Expatriate footballers in Portugal
Brazilian expatriate sportspeople in Belgium
Expatriate footballers in Belgium
Footballers from Belo Horizonte